David Mujiri (born 28 January 1999) is a Georgian professional footballer who last played as a forward for Slovak club ViOn Zlaté Moravce.

Career
Mujiri started his career with Georgian third division side 35th School. In 2017, he joined the youth academy of Alanyaspor in the Turkish top flight. After that, Mujiri joined the youth academy of Moldovan club Sheriff. Before the 2019 season, he signed for WIT Georgia in Georgia. Before the 2020 season, he was sent on loan to Georgian outfit Chikhura from Dinamo (Tbilisi), the most successful team in Georgia.

In 2021, Mujiri signed for Slovak side Zlaté Moravce. On 6 August 2021, he debuted for Zlaté Moravce during a 1–1 draw with Senica.

Personal life
Mujiri is the son of Georgia international David Mujiri.

References

External links
 
 David Mujiri at playmakerstats.com

Living people
1999 births
Footballers from Tbilisi
Footballers from Georgia (country)
Expatriate footballers from Georgia (country)
Association football forwards
FC Sheriff Tiraspol players
FC WIT Georgia players
FC Dinamo Tbilisi players
FC Chikhura Sachkhere players
FC Shukura Kobuleti players
FC ViOn Zlaté Moravce players
Liga 3 (Georgia) players
Erovnuli Liga players
Slovak Super Liga players
Expatriate footballers in Moldova
Expatriate sportspeople from Georgia (country) in Moldova
Expatriate footballers in Slovakia
Expatriate sportspeople from Georgia (country) in Slovakia